Fenwick is an independent chain of department stores in the United Kingdom. It was founded in 1882 by John James Fenwick in Newcastle upon Tyne, and today consists of nine branches. It was a member of the International Association of Department Stores from 1988 to 2010.

As of 2022, the chain is still owned by members of the Fenwick family. The company was chaired by Mark Fenwick until 2017 with Simon Calver appointed as chair in 2021. John Edgar was appointed as CEO of Fenwick in April 2020. In 2012, the company was reported to be valued at £452 million.

History
 John James Fenwick opened his store as Mantle Maker and Furrier in 1882. Born in Richmond, North Yorkshire in 1846,  he learned his trade as a shop assistant early in his career. In 1882, his ambition came to fruition when Fenwick bought and renovated a doctor's house for £181 and 4 shillings at 5 Northumberland Street in Newcastle upon Tyne. The flagship store opened in Newcastle upon Tyne in 1882 and sold mantles, silk goods, dresses, fabrics and trimmings and soon expanded with the purchase of 37, 38 and 40 Northumberland Street in 1884. John's eldest son Fred Fenwick joined the business in 1890. Fred had trained in retail in Paris and is said to have been inspired by Le Bon Marché, which is regarded as one of the first ever department stores.

Fenwick has since expanded its operations. In 1888, it opened a store in Sunderland, but it closed within the year. In 1891, it opened a branch in Bond Street, London. The first fashion store on the street, it later doubled in size in 1980.

The company bought the Joseph Johnson store in Leicester in 1962, which was subsequently rebranded as Fenwick. Fenwick was an anchor department store for the 1976 opening of Brent Cross Shopping Centre in London, which was the first large out-of-town shopping centre in the UK.
A further store was opened in Oxford on the site of the F Cape & Co department store in 1978.

Outlets in Windsor and York followed in 1980 and 1984 respectively, with a limited range of departments, specialising in clothing, fashion accessories and cosmetics. The Ricemans store in Canterbury was acquired in 1986, and rebranded  Fenwick in 2003. The Tunbridge Wells store opened in 1992 as part of the Royal Victoria Place development.

In 2001, Fenwick acquired the Bentalls group of department stores for £70.8 million, with stores in Kingston upon Thames, Worthing, Ealing, Bracknell, Tonbridge and Lakeside. The Lakeside store was closed, and three branches (Worthing, Ealing and Tonbridge) were subsequently sold to J E Beale, with Fenwick retaining only the stores in Kingston upon Thames and Bracknell.

In 2007, Fenwick purchased Williams & Griffin, an independent department store in Colchester, Essex; this continued to trade under the Williams & Griffin name until a 2016 refurbishment, after which it adopted the Fenwick identity.

On 5 January 2017, Mark Fenwick announced that the historic Leicester store was to close. The store closed in March 2017.

In April 2017, Fenwick announced plans to close their Windsor store. The store closed in August 2017.

The last two remaining members of the Fenwick family on the company's board stepped down in October 2017.

Bentalls in Bracknell closed in 2017 with the opening of a new Fenwick store in The Lexicon Shopping Center, located in the same town.

Fenwick launches Fenwick Food, the re-launch of its own-label ventures, followed by Fenwick at Home, its inaugural homeware range, in 2021.

On December 6th 2022 it was announced that the Bond Street store would close in 2024, after 130 years, having sold the store and adjoining property to Lazari Investments for an undisclosed sum. In a statement, the company said: "Amid the turbulent economic environment, fresh capital investment is required in order to return the business to profitable growth."

Current operations

Fenwick has its headquarters at the original Fenwick department store in the centre of Newcastle upon Tyne. The company operates nine outlets across England (May 2020): Newcastle upon Tyne, Bond Street in London, Bracknell, Brent Cross Shopping Centre in London, Canterbury, Colchester, Kingston upon Thames (branded under the historic Bentalls name), Royal Tunbridge Wells and York. In 2022, the Bond Street store was put up for sale at £500 million, listed as a ‘redevelopment opportunity’ after the COVID-19 pandemic failed plans for the Fenwick family to sell the chain entirely

Fenwick Newcastle
The original and flagship store in the group occupies a large site in the centre of Newcastle upon Tyne. The store has expanded many times since its foundation in 1882 and now consists of several interconnected buildings with entrances onto Northumberland Street, Eldon Square, Monument Metro Station and Blackett Street.

Fenwick offers a wide range of goods and services with a focus on premium and luxury products. 
It is one of few department stores in the UK to retain a food hall. This was refurbished in 2015.

The store is known locally for its extravagant Christmas window displays, filled with detailed sets and sophisticated moving figures, which have appeared since 1971.

In 2022, Fenwick announced an investment of £40 million over the next five years in the refurbishment of its Newcastle, England flagship, adding two new atria and renovating the beauty hall and accessories area.

See also
List of department stores of the United Kingdom

References 

Department stores of the United Kingdom
Companies based in Newcastle upon Tyne
Department store buildings in the United Kingdom
Buildings and structures in Newcastle upon Tyne